Barton Township is one of ten townships in Gibson County, Indiana. As of the 2010 census, its population was 1,677 and it contained 720 housing units. Somerville is the township seat.

Barton Township was organized in 1843.

Geography

Cities and towns
 Mackey
 Somerville

Unincorporated towns
 Buckskin

Adjacent townships
Gibson County
 Columbia Township (north)
 Johnson Township (southwest)
 Union Township (west)
 Center Township (northwest)
Pike County
 Monroe Township (east)
Warrick County
 Greer Township (south)
 Hart Township (southeast)

Cemeteries
The township contains seven cemeteries: Albright, Eden, Kilpatrick, Providence, St John's, Somerville and Townsley.

Major highways

Education
Barton Township is part of the East Gibson School Corporation.

Schools
Barton Township School - Mackey

References
 
 United States Census Bureau cartographic boundary files

External links
 Indiana Township Association
 United Township Association of Indiana

Townships in Gibson County, Indiana
Townships in Indiana